The 2002 British Open Championships was held at the Lambs Squash Club with the later stages held at the National Squash Centre from 7–15 April 2002. Peter Nicol won the title defeating John White in the final.

Seeds

Draw and results

Main draw

References

Men's British Open Squash Championships
Men's British Open
Men's British Open Squash Championship
Men's British Open Squash Championship
Men's British Open Squash Championship
2000s in Manchester
Squash competitions in London
Sports competitions in Manchester